The British Rally Championship is a rallying series run over the course of a year, that comprises seven tarmac and gravel surface events 2021 is be the 63rd season of the series. The season began at Oulton Park on 31 May and is due to conclude on 20 November in Northern Ireland.

2021 calendar
For season 2021 there was due to be seven events held on both gravel and tarmac surfaces  however due to the ongoing COVID-19 pandemic, a number of events were cancelled. The 2021 reserve event, the Mull Rally was added to the series making a six round championship. On 24 March it was announced by the BRC that The Neil Howard Stages, taking place in May would be added as the series opener.

Event results

Podium places and information on each event.

2021 British Rally Championship for Drivers

Scoring system

Points are awarded as follows: 25, 18, 15, 12, 10, 8, 6, 4, 2, 1. Drivers may nominate one event as their 'joker', on which they will score additional points: 5, 4, 3, 2, 1. Competitors five best scores will count towards their championship total.

References

British Rally Championship seasons
Rally Championship
British Rally Championship